Sardar Asif Mengal is the head of Zagar Mengal,.Zagar mengal is one of the two main clans of the Mengal tribe in the Balochistan province of Pakistan. He is a popular political and tribal figure of Balochistan. Sardar Asif Mengal plays an important role in the traditional jirga system to resolve conflicts among Baloch tribes.

References

Baloch people
Politicians from Balochistan, Pakistan
Living people
1960 births